WASP-57 is a single G-type main-sequence star about 1310 light-years away. WASP-57 is depleted in heavy elements, having 55% of the solar abundance of iron. WASP-57 is much younger than the Sun at 0.957 billion years.

A multiplicity survey in 2015 did not detect any stellar companions to WASP-57.

Planetary system
In 2012 a transiting hot Jupiter planet b was detected on a tight, circular orbit around WASP-57.

References

Libra (constellation)
G-type main-sequence stars
Planetary systems with one confirmed planet
Planetary transit variables
J14551682-0203275